The Bamraulia is clan of Jat people. They originate from Bamrauli village near Agra and are settled near Gohad  in Madhya Pradesh.

References

Indian surnames
Surnames of Indian origin
Surnames of Hindustani origin
Hindu surnames
Toponymic surnames